Skinderiškis (formerly) is a former village in Kėdainiai district municipality, in Kaunas County, in central Lithuania. Now the area officially belongs to Pilsupiai and Užvarčiai villages. The Skinderiškis Dendrological Park is now located in a former Skinderiškis Manor site.

History
At the end of the 19th century there was a Skinderiškis estate (a property of the Griškevičiai) and watermill. Skinderiškis village of Pajieslys selsovet was liquidated on 27 October 1971.

Demography

References

Villages in Kaunas County
Kėdainiai District Municipality
Former populated places in Lithuania